They Live in Fear is a 1944 American film starring Otto Kruger.

The film was known as America's Children. Filming was announced in August 1943. Otto Kruger joined the film in March 1944.

Plot
A member of the Hitler Youth escapes to America.

Cast
Otto Kruger as Matthew Van Camp
Clifford Severn as Paul Graffen
Pat Parrish as Pat Daniels
Jimmy Carpenter as Johnny Reynolds
Erwin Kalser as Jan Dorchik
Danny Jackson as Googy

References

External links

They Live in Fear at TCMDB

1944 films
American musical drama films
American black-and-white films
1940s musical drama films
1944 drama films
Films directed by Josef Berne
Columbia Pictures films
1940s English-language films
1940s American films